The Australian Association for the Teaching of English (AATE) is the national arm of the state/territory associations for the teaching of English. All members of state and territory organisations pay an affiliation fee to AATE and are automatically members of the national association.

Affiliated State and Territory Associations

History of AATE
AATE was formed, on the initiative of Peter B. McDonald, past President of the South Australian English Teachers Association, at a meeting in September 1964. Representatives from New South Wales, the Australian Capital Territory, South Australia, Western Australia and Victoria attended this first meeting. Queensland and the Northern Territory joined the Association a few years later.

Publications
 English in Australia (peer-reviewed, scholarly journal)
 Interface series (Wakefield Press)
 Golden Stories Anthology
 The Artful English Teacher (AATE)

References

Educational organisations based in Australia